The Speaker of the Parliament of the Democratic Socialist Republic of Sri Lanka is the presiding officer of the chamber. The current Speaker of the Parliament is Mahinda Yapa Abeywardena, in office since 20 August 2020. The Speaker fulfills a number of important functions in relation to the operation of the House, which is based upon the British Westminster Parliamentary system.

The Speaker is second in the Sri Lankan presidential line of succession, after the Prime Minister.

Origins

In 1931 under the Donoughmore Constitution the State Council of Ceylon was established and in it the first office of a Speaker of a legislative body was created as the Speaker of the State Council.

In 1947,  according to the recommendations of the Soulbury Commission the State Council was dissolved and a Parliament was established in the Westminster model with an upper house, the Senate and the House of Representatives. While the head of the President of the Senate became the head of the Senate, the Speaker of the House of Representatives became the presiding officer of the House of Representatives. The office of the Speaker, as it exists now, was established in 1947, with the opening of the First Parliament of Ceylon on 4 February 1948, granting of independence and the establishment of the Dominion of Ceylon.

Duties and powers

The Speaker presides over the House's debates, determining which members may speak. The Speaker is also responsible for maintaining order during debate, and may punish members who break the rules of the House. The Speaker remains strictly non-partisan, and renounces all affiliation with his or her former political party when taking office for the duration of his term. The Speaker does not take part in debate or vote (except to break ties). Apart from duties relating to presiding over the House, the Speaker also performs administrative and procedural functions, and remains a constituency Member of Parliament (MP). The Speaker would be a chairmen of the constitutional council. The Speaker may accept the resignation of the president. The chief justice in consultation with the Speaker may determine that the president is temporarily unable to exercise, perform and discharge the powers, duties and functions and appoint the prime minister as acting president.

Appointment

As per the Article 64 of the Constitution when Parliament first meets after a general election, it will elect three members to serve as the Speaker, Deputy Speaker and Chairman of Committees (known simply as the Deputy Speaker) and the Deputy Chairman of Committees. The Speaker would vacate his office only if he tenders his resignation to the President or ceases to be a Member of Parliament or when Parliament dissolved.

Deputies

The Speaker is assisted by two deputies, all of whom are elected by the House. These are Deputy Speaker and the Deputy Chairman of Committees. In the absence of the Speaker, the Deputy Speaker or in their absence the Deputy Chairman of Committees, shall preside at sittings of Parliament. If none of them is present, a Member elected by Parliament for the sitting shall preside at the sitting of Parliament.

Precedence, salary, residence and privileges

The Speaker is the third highest-ranking official in Sri Lanka. At present, Speaker ranks in the order of precedence after the President and Prime Minister. From 1948 to 1971 (when the Senate was abolished) the Speaker ranked fifth in the precedence after the Governor-General, the Prime Minister, the Chief Justice and the President of the Senate. From 1971 to 1978, the Speaker ranked fourth in the precedence after the Governor-General/President, the Prime Minister and the Chief Justice. After the second amendment to the Republican Constitution in 1978, in which the Speaker was placed second in the presidential line of succession; the Speaker gained his current position in the order of precedence.

In 2016, the Speaker received a salary of 68,500 Sri Lankan rupees per month and other entitlements of a Member of Parliament. In addition, the Speaker can use the Speaker's Residence and entitled to transport and security arranged by the Parliamentary Secretariat. At each sitting of parliament, the Speaker (or the presiding officer) travels in to the chamber in procession, after the Sergeant-at-Arms carrying the ceremonial mace that symbolises the authority of the Parliament. Sergeant-at-Arms attends the Speaker on other occasions. The Speaker has his office in the Parliament Complex and the Secretary-General of Parliament, who is in charge of the administrative duties of Parliament reports to the Speaker.

Official dress

On ceremonial sittings or occasions, the Speaker wears a robe of black satin damask trimmed with gold lace, a mourning rosette (also known as a 'wig bag') and frogs with full bottomed wig. On normal sitting days, the Speaker wears only the robe and rosette without the wig or in certain cases without the official dress. This practice was adopted from the official dress of the Speaker of the House of Commons.

List of speakers of Parliament

Parties

See also

 Parliament of Sri Lanka

References

External links

 Speaker of Parliament
 Speaker of the Seventh Parliament of the Democratic Socialist Republic of Sri Lanka

Sri Lanka, Parliament
 
Speakers
Parliament